The 2023 Rio Open, also known as Rio Open presented by Claro for sponsorship reasons, was a professional men's tennis tournament played on outdoor clay courts. It was the 9th edition of the Rio Open, and part of the ATP Tour 500 of the 2023 ATP Tour. It took place in Rio de Janeiro, Brazil between February 20–26, 2023.

Champions

Singles 

  Cameron Norrie def.  Carlos Alcaraz, 5–7, 6–4, 7–5.

Doubles 

  Máximo González /  Andrés Molteni def.  Juan Sebastián Cabal /  Marcelo Melo, 6–1, 7–6(7–3)

Points and prize money

Point distribution

Prize money 

*per team

Singles main-draw entrants

Seeds 

 1 Rankings are as of 13 February 2023.

Other entrants 
The following players received wildcards into the singles main draw:
  Mateus Alves
  Thomaz Bellucci
  João Fonseca

The following players received entry using a protected ranking into the singles main draw: 
  Hugo Dellien
  Dominic Thiem

The following player received entry into the singles main draw as a special exempt:
  Juan Pablo Varillas

The following players received entry from the qualifying draw:
  Facundo Bagnis
  Tomás Barrios Vera 
  Hugo Gaston 
  Nicolás Jarry

The following player received entry as a lucky loser:
  Juan Manuel Cerúndolo

Withdrawals 
  Federico Coria → replaced by  Juan Manuel Cerúndolo 
  Guido Pella → replaced by  Dušan Lajović

Doubles main-draw entrants

Seeds 

 1 Rankings as of 13 February 2023.

Other entrants 
The following pairs received wildcards into the doubles main draw:
  Thomaz Bellucci /  Thiago Monteiro
  Marcelo Demoliner /  Felipe Meligeni Alves 

The following pair received entry from the qualifying draw:
  Nikola Ćaćić /  Andrea Pellegrino

The following pair received entry as lucky losers:
  Mateus Alves /  João Fonseca

Withdrawals 
  Thomaz Bellucci /  Thiago Monteiro → replaced by  Mateus Alves /  João Fonseca
  Federico Coria /  Diego Schwartzman → replaced by  Tomás Martín Etcheverry /  Diego Schwartzman
  Marcel Granollers /  Horacio Zeballos → replaced by  Francisco Cabral /  Horacio Zeballos
  Jamie Murray /  Michael Venus → replaced by  Sadio Doumbia /  Fabien Reboul
  Lorenzo Musetti /  Andrea Vavassori → replaced by  Alexander Erler /  Lucas Miedler

References

External links 
 Official website

2023
Rio Open
Rio Open
Rio Open